Rase may refer to:

People
 
 Betty Jane Rase, also known as B. J. Baker, Miss America competitor
 Laurence Rase (born 1977), Belgian taekwondo practitioner

Places
 River Rase, England

Organisations
 Royal Agricultural Society of England